The Sekta Archaeological Living Museum is a museum in Sekta village in the Indian state of Manipur. It is a protected archaeological site which is one of the six mounds identified in the area. It is known for its secondary burial finds. This site was excavated by the Archaeological Survey of India in association with the State Archaeology Department of Manipur. The Department of History of the Manipur University was also associated with the excavations carried out in 1991.

Location

Features
The Sekta archaeological site is reported to have 6 cleanly demarcated burial mounds. Of these, only one burial mound was excavated.

The excavations have unearthed finds which are identified as of the proto-Meitei tribes, one of the earliest ethnic groups of Manipur, also called the Sekta people, whose cultural practice of burying their dead in graves was revealed in which other essential items of social and economic life were also buried. With these excavations   of the burial cum habitation area dated to late centuries BC, archaeologist and historians have been able to reassess the historical link to the people of Manipur. It has also been evaluated that in the burial mound more than one group of people lived with exclusive burial areas depending on their occupation. The excavations were divided, stratification wise, to seven cultural periods in succession. The finds from these consisted of different types of urn burials, which also contained several funerary items made of copper, brass and iron and a relic casket made of bell metal,  or bronze of Buddhist origin.

See also 
 Imphal Peace Museum
 INA War Museum
 Kakching Garden
 Keibul Lamjao National Park - world's only floating national park in Manipur, India
 Khonghampat Orchidarium
 Loktak Folklore Museum
 Manipur State Museum
 Manipur Zoological Garden
 Phumdi - Floating biomasses in Manipur, India
 Yangoupokpi-Lokchao Wildlife Sanctuary

References

Bibliography

Archaeological sites in Manipur
Imphal East district
Museums in Manipur
Tourist attractions in Manipur